Parker Ridge is a  mountain ridge located in the upper North Saskatchewan River valley in Banff National Park, in the Canadian Rockies of Alberta, Canada. Its nearest higher peak is Mount Athabasca,  to the west. Parker Ridge is situated along the west side of the Icefields Parkway and southeast of Sunwapta Pass. Parker Ridge is a ski-touring destination in the winter and popular hiking destination in the summer because it is situated beside the Icefields Parkway allowing easy access, and is nearly entirely above treeline allowing good views of the surrounding mountain landscape. A  trail gains  of elevation from the highway to the top of the ridge. Wandering east or west along the ridge provides views of Cirrus Mountain, the north face of Mount Saskatchewan, Saskatchewan Glacier, Mount Athabasca, Hilda Peak, and Nigel Peak among others.

History

Parker Ridge was named for Elizabeth Parker (1856–1944), co-founder of the Alpine Club of Canada in 1906 along with Arthur Oliver Wheeler. The Elizabeth Parker hut near Lake O'Hara in Yoho National Park is also named in her honor.

The mountain's name was officially adopted in 1978 by the Geographical Names Board of Canada.

Geology

Like other mountains in Banff Park, Parker Ridge is composed of sedimentary rock laid down from the Precambrian to Jurassic periods. Formed in shallow seas, this sedimentary rock was pushed east and over the top of younger rock during the Laramide orogeny.

Climate

Based on the Köppen climate classification, Parker Ridge is located in a subarctic climate with cold, snowy winters, and mild summers.

References

See also
The Canadian Rockies Trail Guide
List of mountains of Canada
Geography of Alberta

Gallery
Views from Parker Ridge

External links
 Parks Canada web site: Banff National Park
 Weather: Parker Ridge

Two-thousanders of Alberta
Mountains of Banff National Park
Canadian Rockies